Kim Sun-ok (born  in Seoul) is a South Korean bobsledder.

Kim competed at the 2014 Winter Olympics for South Korea. She teamed with Shin Mi-Hwa in the two-woman event, finishing 18th.

Kim made her World Cup debut in December 2013. As of April 2014, her best World Cup finish is 20th, at a pair of events in 2013-14.

References

1980 births
Living people
South Korean female bobsledders
Bobsledders at the 2014 Winter Olympics
Olympic bobsledders of South Korea
Sportspeople from Seoul